Lagitupu Tulimu is a political figure from the Pacific nation of Tuvalu, who represented the constituency of Nanumea. He served as the Acting Prime Minister of Tuvalu from 8 December 2000 to 24 February 2001 following the death of incumbent Ionatana Ionatana.

Early political career
He became deputy prime minister and minister of finance in April 1999, when Ionatana Ionatana's government took office. One of the main issues of Ionatana's Government in which Tuilimu served was the country's membership of the United Nations, which Tuvalu assumed in this period.

Acting Prime Minister of Tuvalu
On the death of Ionatana Ionatana on December 8, 2000 Tuilimu served as acting Prime Minister of Tuvalu, until the election of Faimalaga Luka by parliament on February 24, 2001. His assumption of this office came because he had been the deputy prime minister of Tuvalu on the death of Ionatana. This was the first time that a sitting Prime Minister of Tuvalu had died in office.

See also
 Politics of Tuvalu

References 

Prime Ministers of Tuvalu
Deputy Prime Ministers of Tuvalu
Finance Ministers of Tuvalu
Living people
Year of birth missing (living people)